Amanullah Mirza Qajar (1857—1937) was a prince in Persia's Qajar dynasty. He was also an Imperial Russian and Azerbaijani military commander, obtaining the rank of Major General.

Early life
Amanullah Mirza Qajar was born on January 8, 1857, in the city of Shusha in the Russian Empire (modern day Azerbaijan.) He was the 17th son of Prince Bahman Mirza Qajar of Persia by one of the latter's junior wives. His Russian family name was Persidskii (literally, "of Persia.")

Career

Russian Army 
Qajar entered military service on July 19, 1879, in the 164th Infantry Regiment Zagatala. In 1883, he was promoted to Second Lieutenant. On November 20, 1886, he was transferred to the 2nd Battalion plastun of the Kuban Cossacks. On May 9, 1902, Qajar was promoted to yesaul. On April 16, 1909, he became the Army yesaul-commander of the 9th Battalion of the Kuban plastun.

First World War
During World War I, Qajar fought on the Austrian front. He was awarded the Order of St. Anne 2nd Class with swords, the Order St. Vladimir 3rd Class with swords, and the Order St. Stanislaus 3rd Class. On April 25, 1915, he was promoted to colonel. Because of a severe leg wound, Amanullah was sent to the rear for treatment. In 1916, he returned to the front. Along with his battalion, he fought near the village of Marhonovka. Qajar captured the enemy trenches and destroyed the enemy's manpower. During the operations on November 5, 1916, he was awarded the Saint George Sword. He received the rank of Major General in 1917. After the February Revolution, he lived in Tbilisi and Shusha.

Azerbaijan Democratic Republic 
After the Azerbaijan Democratic Republic (ADR) created its first army as a newly established state, Qajar filed a report on December 1, 1918, to the newly established Ministry of War with a request of admission to their armed forces. In March 1919 he was a part of the emergency diplomatic mission of the Republic of Azerbaijan and participated in the Persian government in Tehran. He served as chairman of the central military service presence. On January 27, 1920, Major General Qajar was appointed as the deputy chief of the 1st Infantry Division of the ADR and head of the garrisons in Khankendi and Shusha. He participated in fighting the attacks of the Armenian armed forces on the military units of the ADR on 22–23 March 1920.

Iran 
After the fall of the ADR in connection with the repression of the Bolsheviks, Amanullah was forced to leave for Iran. Living in Tehran, he taught at the military school and participated in the formation of the Iranian army. He was a deputy of the Majlis (Parliament) of Iran, and the chairman of the society of the Iranian-Soviet friendship. He died in 1937 in Tehran.

Sources
 
 Азербайджанская Демократическая Республика (1918—1920). Армия. (Документы и материалы). — Баку, 1998
 Азербайджанская Демократическая Республика (1918—1920). Внешняя политика. (Документы и материалы). — Баку, 1998

1857 births
1937 deaths
Military personnel from Shusha
Amanullah
Russian military personnel of the Russo-Japanese War
Russian military personnel of World War I
Russian people of Iranian descent
Azerbaijani military personnel of the Armenian–Azerbaijani War (1918–1920)
Recipients of the Gold Sword for Bravery
Recipients of the Order of St. Vladimir, 3rd class
Recipients of the Order of St. Anna, 2nd class
Recipients of the Order of Saint Stanislaus (Russian), 3rd class
Imperial Russian Army generals
Emigrants from the Russian Empire to Iran
Azerbaijani nobility
Azerbaijani emigrants to Iran
Members of the National Consultative Assembly
Generals of the Azerbaijan Democratic Republic
Azerbaijani people of Iranian descent
Bahmani family